Ura e Shtrenjtë is a small village in the valley of the river Kir in northern Albania. It was part of the former municipality of Postribë, in Shkodër County. At the 2015 local government reform it became part of the municipality Shkodër. It is a very small and poor community  making a basic living off the land. The farmers produce a variety of crops, from corn and beans, to raising livestock. Supported by Oxfam, the farmers have also expanded in honey production. The honey is very aromatic, as its source as a mixture of wild chestnut, sage and thyme pollen.

The village is divided in two by a deep gorge, which used to be crossed by a large stone bridge.

A few years ago, the waters of the river were so high that the old bridge was washed away. The community did not have the resources or the money to replace it with a similar one, so all they could do was to lay down a narrow metal plank to serve as a bridge. But not only is this extremely unsafe, it is also little use when, in the springtime, melting snow from the mountain causes the river to swell again. The waters swallow the little makeshift bridge, and can stay that high for up to five or six weeks. During that time, people on one side of the village are totally cut off from the rest of the community and outside world.

References

External links 
 Albania Bridge
 Oxfam- Beekeeping in Ure e Shtrentje
 BBC- Building bridges

Populated places in Shkodër
Villages in Shkodër County